Cristian Eugen Chivu (born 26 October 1980) is a Romanian professional football manager and former player who is the head coach of Inter Milan's under-19 side.

A defender, he began his career with hometown club CSM Reșița before moving to FC Universitatea Craiova in 1998, leaving Romania to join Dutch club Ajax a season later. His performances as the captain of Ajax inspired an €18 million transfer to Roma in 2003. Chivu won the Coppa Italia in his last of four seasons in Rome before a transfer to Inter Milan, where he spent the rest of his career before retiring in 2014. After recovering from a fractured skull, Chivu wore a distinctive protective headgear, similar to Petr Čech's, from 2010 onwards. His honours at Inter included a treble of the Italian league, domestic cup, and the UEFA Champions League in 2010.

Chivu earned 75 international caps for Romania between 1999 and 2010, and was part of the squads for UEFA European Championships in 2000 and 2008. After retiring, he became a football pundit for Italian television stations Sky Sport and Fox Sports. He is also a technical observer for UEFA.

Club career

Early career
Chivu's first professional club was CSM Reșița. After moving to FC Universitatea Craiova, his reputation began to rise and his performances sparked interest from some larger clubs outside of Romania. Dutch club Ajax was particularly impressed with Chivu and signed him in 1999.

Ajax
At Ajax, Chivu developed a reputation as a reliable fullback and a free-kick specialist. Then-manager Ronald Koeman appointed him as captain of the club. With Chivu as captain, Ajax dominated the Dutch Eredivisie with an exciting young squad. Playing alongside Chivu were future stars such as Rafael van der Vaart, Wesley Sneijder, Johnny Heitinga, Zlatan Ibrahimović and Maxwell. Chivu played a pivotal role for Ajax in their UEFA Champions League run in the 2002–03 season, when they came to within a minute of the semi-finals. That season, Chivu was in a quintet of Ajax players – himself, Zlatan Ibrahimović, Maxwell, Wesley Sneijder and Andy van der Meyde – who all went on to later join Inter Milan.

Roma
In 2003, Roma expressed their interest in signing Chivu. At the time, Roma had an enormous debt and there were questions raised over Roma's ability to pay any proposed fees. Seeking to silence the increasing doubt over their financial situation, Roma sought a bank guarantee, which was subsequently denied. After much speculation, however, Roma finally completed the purchase of Chivu in September, ending the long and protracted saga. The fee was €18 million. Though he became a regular in defence, he made limited appearances due to injuries. He won the 2006–07 Coppa Italia in his last season with Roma. During the summer transfer window, he was once again a subject of transfer speculation, with newly crowned La Liga champions Real Madrid reportedly making a formal bid, while Barcelona and Inter Milan were also interested in signing the defender.

Inter Milan
Chivu was reported to be in the middle of a tug-of-war between Barcelona and Real Madrid during the 2007 summer transfer window. After a four-year spell which yielded a Coppa Italia, Chivu left Roma and signed a five-year contract with Serie A rivals Inter on 27 July 2007. The transfer fee was €16 million, which €3 million of the transfer fee paid via defender Marco Andreolli moved to Roma in a co-ownership deal. His first season with the defending Serie A champions was a successful one, as he won the Serie A title that had eluded him during his time at Roma.

During the Champions League match at home to Manchester United in the 2008–09 season, Chivu had a terrific game, denying Wayne Rooney and Cristiano Ronaldo many times, and won Man of the Match ahead of Inter goalkeeper Julio César.

Chivu was a regular at left back during the 2009–10 season, as Walter Samuel and Lúcio became the preferred centre back pairing. On 6 January against Chievo, Chivu was stretchered off early in the second half after colliding heads with Chievo striker Sergio Pellissier. He was in two hours of surgery for a skull fracture and later cleared of any danger. Although it was initially thought he might be out for the rest of the season, he returned to Serie A on 24 March. After this, he needed to wear a headguard in matches. A month later, Chivu scored his first goal for Inter in a game against Atalanta, a terrific 30-yard strike. On 22 May 2010, he was in Inter's starting line-up in the UEFA Champions League Final against Bayern Munich, which Inter won 2–0.

He scored his second goal for Inter in the 2010–11 season against Cesena which turned out to be the game winner in a 3–2 win for Inter. He also scored the winning penalty for Inter in their 2009–10 Coppa Italia win over Napoli on 26 January 2011.

Chivu left Inter after his contract was terminated by mutual consent on 31 March 2014. The very same day he announced his retirement from football on his Facebook page.

International career

In 1999, Chivu was chosen to represent the Romania national under-21 team and quickly made the step up to play for the full side. In 2001, he won Cyprus International Football Tournament 2001.    
He represented his country at both UEFA Euro 2000 and Euro 2008. Despite being capped only four times prior to the Euro 2000, he started all four matches and scored his first international goal.

At Euro 2008, he earned plaudits for his performance, keeping previous FIFA World Cup champions Italy and runners-up France at bay, despite being played in a less familiar role as a holding midfielder. He captained Romania through World Cup qualification, but they failed to make the play-offs, finishing fifth in their group. On 21 May 2011, Chivu announced his retirement from the national team.

Managerial career
In August 2019, Chivu enrolled in the UEFA Pro Licence courses at Coverciano.

In July 2021 he was announced as new head coach of Inter Milan Primavera.

Personal life
Chivu speaks Italian, Dutch, Spanish and English, as well as his native Romanian.

His father, Mircea was also a footballer and a coach, the Mircea Chivu Stadium from Reșița is named in his honor. He played as a right back for FCM Reșița and Universitatea Craiova winning the 1973–74 Divizia A with the team from Craiova. Mircea was coach at FCM Reșița when Cristian started his career. According to Calcio Italia magazine, Chivu has been involved in opening football schools around Romania for the past few years, and he said "I hope that he is proud when he looks down on me" in reference to his father who died in 1998.

He is married to Adelina Elisei who on 12 February 2009 gave birth to their first child, a daughter named Natalia.

Career statistics

Club

International stats
Scores and results table. Romania's goal tally first. Was captain in matches highlighted in green:

Honours
CSM Reșița
Divizia B: 1996–97

Ajax
Eredivisie: 2001–02
Dutch Cup: 2001–02
Dutch Supercup: 2002

Roma
Coppa Italia: 2006–07

Inter Milan
Serie A: 2007–08, 2008–09, 2009–10
Coppa Italia: 2009–10, 2010–11
Supercoppa Italiana: 2010
UEFA Champions League: 2009–10
FIFA Club World Cup: 2010

Individual
 Ajax Talent of the Year (Marco van Basten Award): 1999–2000
 Dutch Golden Shoe: 2002
 Ajax Player of the Year (Rinus Michels Award): 2000–01, 2002–03
 Gazeta Sporturilor Romanian Footballer of the Year: 2002, 2009, 2010
 UEFA Team of the Year: 2002
Giacinto Facchetti Awards: 2021

References

External links

 Inter Milan profile
 
  
 

Living people
1980 births
Romanian footballers
FC U Craiova 1948 players
AFC Ajax players
A.S. Roma players
Inter Milan players
Liga I players
Eredivisie players
Serie A players
Romania under-21 international footballers
Romania youth international footballers
Romania international footballers
UEFA Euro 2000 players
UEFA Euro 2008 players
Romanian expatriate footballers
Romanian expatriate sportspeople in the Netherlands
Expatriate footballers in the Netherlands
Romanian expatriate sportspeople in Italy
Expatriate footballers in Italy
Sportspeople from Reșița
CSM Reșița players
Inter Milan non-playing staff
Association football defenders
UEFA Champions League winning players